Emmanuel Nii Ashie Kotey (born 2 October 1953) is a Ghanaian judge and academic. He has been a Justice of the Supreme Court of Ghana since his appointment in 2018.

Kotey was born in Osu, a suburb of Accra. After obtaining his LL.M and Ph.D. from the University of London, he enrolled at the Ghana School of Law and was subsequently called to the bar after completing his studies in 1982. He has been a lecturer of the University of Ghana from 1981 until his appointment to the Supreme Court of Ghana bench on 2018. While at the university, he served as the Dean of the university's Faculty of Law and acting director of the Ghana School of Law. He also served as the Chief Executive of the Forestry Commission of Ghana from 2007 to 2009. He was a visiting scholar in the United States of America, the United Kingdom and the Netherlands. Prior to his appointment as Justice of the Supreme Court, he was an associate professor at the University of Ghana Faculty of Law.

Early life and education
Kotey was born on 2 October 1953 at Osu, a suburb of Accra. He began schooling in 1959 at the New Ghana International School in Osu but left in 1962 to attend the Presbyterian Primary School at Ada Foah. In 1964, he enrolled at the Presbyterian Middle Boarding School at Osu. He proceeded to St. Thomas Aquinas Senior High School in 1966, where he obtained his Ordinary Level ('O'-Level) certificate in 1971. He continued at Apam Senior High School that same year for his Advanced Level ('A'-Level) certificate which he received in 1973. In October 1973, he entered the University of Ghana to study law at bachelor's degree level. He graduated in June 1976 with his bachelor of laws degree. He proceeded to the United Kingdom to pursue a post graduate degree in law (LL.M) which he obtained from the University of London in 1977. He received his doctorate degree from the same university in 1981 and returned to Ghana that same year to enroll at the Ghana School of Law in Accra. He completed his studies in 1982 and was called to the bar in that same year.

Career
Kotey became a lecturer at the University of Ghana in 1981. While a lecturer at the university, he worked as a Solicitor and Advocate at Azinyo Chambers in 1982. In 1999 he worked as a consultant at Kotey and Associates until 2007 when he was appointed Chief Executive of the Ghana Forestry Commission. He was dean of the University of Ghana Faculty of Law from 2003 to 2007 and from 2005 to 2007 he served as the acting director of the Ghana School of Law. He was a visiting scholar to the Pritzker School of Law, Chicago from May to June 2001, a visiting professor of Human Rights and Democratization in Africa to the Center for Human Rights at the University of Pretoria from March to April 2001, a visiting scholar at the Queens University of Belfast, Northern Ireland, United Kingdom in March 2000 and at the Faculty of Law of the University of Leiden, Netherlands from August to September 1999, and a visiting professor at the College of Law, Stetson University, Florida USA in 1997. He is the Chairman of the Presbyterian University College Council.

Appointment
Kotey was nominated together with three other judges (Justice Agnes Dordzie, Justice Samuel Marful-Sau and Justice Nene Amegatcher) by the president of Ghana, Nana Akufo-Addo in 2018. He together with the three judges were recommended to the president by the three nominating bodies, the Chief Justice of Ghana, Attorney General of Ghana and the Ghana Bar Association. A letter was sent to the president by the then Chief Justice Sophia Akuffo on behalf of the Judicial Council to recommend the judges to the president. The president in March 2018 consulted the Council of State requesting their counsel as is required by law and approved the nominations based on the advise of the council. The names of the Judges were sent to parliament and he appeared before the Appointment's Committee of Parliament on Thursday, 23 August 2018. He together with the three other nominated judges were approved by parliament on 25 September 2018 and sworn into office in October 2018.

He is part of a seven-member panel that heard the 2020 election petition by John Mahama against The Electoral Commission of Ghana and Nana Akufo-Addo

Personal life
Nii Ashie Kotey is married with children. He is a Presbyterian and worships at the Ebenezer Presbyterian Church, Osu.

See also
List of judges of the Supreme Court of Ghana
Supreme Court of Ghana

References

1953 births
Living people
Justices of the Supreme Court of Ghana
Ga-Adangbe people
Alumni of the University of London
University of Ghana alumni
Academic staff of the University of Ghana
Osu Salem School alumni
People educated at St. Thomas Aquinas Senior High School
21st-century Ghanaian judges
Ghanaian Presbyterians